The Bison-beast (from Sumerian: gud-alim 'bison bull') in Sumerian religion was one of the Heroes slain by Ninurta, patron god of Lagash, in Mesopotamia (ancient Iraq). 

Its body was hung on the beam of Ninurta's chariot (lines 55–63).

See also
Bull of Heaven
Kusarikku
 Lamassu
Ninlil
Sumerian religion
Anzû

References

External links
The Electronic Text Corpus of Sumerian Literature

Mesopotamian legendary creatures
Mythological bulls